The Cameroon national football team (French: Équipe du Cameroun de football), also known as the Indomitable Lions (French: les lions indomptables), represents Cameroon in men's international football. It is controlled by the Fédération Camerounaise de Football, a member of FIFA and its African confederation CAF. 

The team has qualified for the FIFA World Cup eight times, more than any other African team, and four times in a row between 1990 and 2002. However, the team has only made it out of the group stage once. They were the first African team to reach the quarter-final of the World Cup in 1990, losing to England in extra time. They have also won five Africa Cup of Nations.

Cameroon is the first and, as of 2022, only African country to defeat Brazil in either friendly or tournament play, besting them in the 2003 Confederations Cup and 2022 FIFA World Cup by identical 1-0 scores.

History

1956–2000: Early years
Cameroon played its first match against Belgian Congo in 1956, losing 3–2. They first qualified for the Africa Cup of Nations in 1970, but were knocked out in the first round. Two years later, as hosts, the Indomitable Lions finished third after being knocked out by their neighbours and future champions Congo in the 1972 Africa Cup of Nations. They would not qualify for the competition for another ten years.

Cameroon qualified for its first FIFA World Cup in 1982. With the increase from 16 teams to 24, Cameroon qualified along with Algeria to represent Africa at the tournament in Spain. Cameroon was drawn into Group 1 with Italy, Poland, and Peru. In their first game, Cameroon faced Peru and drew 0–0. They then held Poland goalless before a surprise 1–1 draw with eventual winners Italy. Despite being unbeaten, they failed to qualify for the second round, having scored fewer goals than Italy.

Two years later, Cameroon qualified for the 1984 Africa Cup of Nations, held in Ivory Coast. They finished second in their first-round group before beating Algeria on penalties in the semi-final. In the final, Cameroon beat Nigeria 3–1 with goals from René N'Djeya, Théophile Abega and Ernest Ebongué to become champions of Africa for the first time.

Cameroon qualified for the 1990 World Cup by surpassing Nigeria and beating Tunisia in the final round playoff. In the final tournament, Cameroon were drawn into Group B with Argentina, Romania and the Soviet Union. Cameroon defeated defending champions Argentina in the opening game 1–0 with a goal scored by François Omam-Biyik. Cameroon later defeated Romania 2–1 and lost to the Soviet Union 0–4, becoming the first side to top a World Cup Finals group with a negative goal difference. In the second round, Cameroon defeated Colombia 2–1 with the 38-year-old Roger Milla scoring two goals in extra-time.

In the quarter-finals, Cameroon faced England. After 25 minutes, England's David Platt scored for England, while in the second-half, Cameroon came back with a 61st-minute penalty from Emmanuel Kundé and took the lead with Eugène Ekéké on 65 minutes. England, however, equalized in the 83rd minute with a penalty from Gary Lineker, while Lineker again found the net via a 105th-minute penalty to make the eventual scoreline 3–2 for England. The team was coached by Russian manager and former player Valeri Nepomniachi.

The 1994 World Cup in the United States saw the adjustment of representation for African teams qualifying, from two to three. Cameroon qualified along with Nigeria and Morocco. In the final tournament, Cameroon were drawn into Group B with Sweden, Brazil and Russia. After a 2–2 draw against Sweden, Cameroon lost to Brazil and Russia sealed their elimination. In their last game against Russia, the then 42-year-old Roger Milla became the oldest player to play and score in a World Cup finals match. The team was coached by French-born Henri Michel.

The 1998 World Cup in France saw the increase of 24 to 32 teams, with Cameroon one of the five countries representing Africa. Cameroon were drawn into Group B with Italy, Chile and Austria. Despite drawing with Chile and Austria (after leading 1–0 against them until the 90th minute), a 3–0 defeat to Italy saw Cameroon finish bottom of the group. Cameroon had three players sent off in the course of the tournament, more than any other team. They also had the highest card count per game of any team, collecting an average of four bookings in each match they played. It was also during this tournament that a certain Samuel Eto'o was exposed to Cameroonians. He was the youngest player of the tournament alongside Michael Owen of England. The team was coached by French-born Claude Le Roy.

Post-2000
Cameroon qualified for the 2002 World Cup in Korea-Japan, clinching first place in their group which included Angola, Zambia and Togo. Cameroon were drawn into Group E alongside Germany, the Republic of Ireland and Saudi Arabia. Cameroon started with a 1–1 draw with Ireland after giving up the lead and later defeated Saudi Arabia 1–0. In their last game, Cameroon were defeated 2–0 by Germany and were narrowly eliminated by the Irish, who had not lost a game.

Cameroon started the 2002 African Cup of Nations competition with a 1–0 win over DR Congo. That was followed by another 1–0 win against Ivory Coast, and a comfortable 3–0 win against Togo. These results led Cameroon to qualify from the group stage to the quarter-finals as their group's winner. In the knockout stage, M'Boma's goal in the 62nd minute lifted Cameroon over Egypt 1–0. Cameroon would defeat hosts Mali 3-0 in the semi-final on 7 February on route to repeating as champions by edging Senegal 3-2 on penalties following a scoreless 120 minutes on 13 February, and thereby qualifying for the 2003 Confederations Cup in France.

There, the Indomitable Lions became the first African country to defeat Brazil, courtesy of Samuel Eto'o's tally in the 83rd minute of their opening match on 13 June. Cameroon subsequently defeated Turkey and drew the USA before dispatching Colombia in the semi-final. However, the latter was overshadowed by the sudden on-field collapse of Cameroon midfielder Marc-Vivien Foé in the 71st minute. Medics spent 45 minutes attempting to restart his heart, and although he was still alive upon arrival at the stadium's medical centre, he died shortly afterwards. An autopsy determined the cause of death to have been hypertrophic cardiomyopathy, an hereditary condition known to increase the risk of sudden death during physical exercise. The Final on June 29 against France, consequently, became not about the game but rather an occasion for both teams and fans to honor Foé. France prevailed 1-0 following Thierry Henry's golden goal in the 7th minute of extra time, but abstained from traditional post-match celebrations. Instead, the tournament closed with one last tribute to Foé as Cameroon took a lap around the stadium holding a large photo of their fallen teammate.

In the 2006 World Cup qualifying round, Cameroon were drawn into Group 3 with the Ivory Coast, Egypt, Libya, Sudan and Benin. Cameroon led the group until their final game, when Pierre Womé failed to convert a late penalty. On 8 October 2005, Cameroon drew with Egypt 1–1 while eventual World Cup debutants Ivory Coast defeated Sudan 3–1, preventing Cameroon from travelling to Germany.

In Cameroon's 2010 World Cup qualifying campaign, the team was grouped with Gabon, Togo and Morocco. After a slow start in their campaign with a loss to Togo, the coach of Cameroon, Otto Pfister, resigned. Frenchman Paul Le Guen was appointed as the new coach after a draw against Morocco. Le Guen's appointment caused an uprise in Cameroon's spirits as they earned a win against Gabon in Libreville, followed by another win against the Panthers four days later in Yaoundé. One month later, they defeated Togo in Yaoundé by three goals. On 14 November 2009, Cameroon defeated the Atlas Lions of Morocco 2–0 in Fez in their last match of their campaign. Gabon was also defeated by Togo 1–0 in Lomé. Both results caused Cameroon to qualify for the 2010 World Cup finals, held in South Africa.

The Indomitable Lions were the first team to be mathematically eliminated in the 2010 World Cup, going out in their second group match to Denmark after losing 1–2, preceded by a 0–1 defeat to Japan.

Cameroon started the 2017 Africa Cup of Nations competition with a 1–1 draw to Burkina Faso, followed by a 2–1 win against Guinea-Bissau, and an unconvincing goalless draw against the hosts Gabon. These results were enough for Cameroon to qualify from the group stage to the quarter-finals, where they met Senegal in a close match that Cameroon won 5–4 in a penalty shootout after it had ended goalless in extra time. In the semi-finals, Cameroon met Ghana and won the match 2–0 to qualify to the final.

On 5 February 2017, and after a close match, Cameroon won the African Cup of Nations for the fifth time after defeating seven-time champions Egypt 2–1 in the final, by Vincent Aboubakar's late goal in the 89th minute of the match.
As champions, Cameroon qualified for the 2017 FIFA Confederations Cup in Russia, where they were eliminated in the group stage.

Cameroon qualified for the 2022 World Cup in Qatar via the away goals rule after defeating hosts Algeria 2-1 on 29 March 2022 thanks to Karl Toko Ekambi's winner in the 124th minute of the second leg of their CAF third round home-and-away tie with The Fennec Foxes. On 2 December 2022, in the final match of Group G, The Indomitable Lions made history by becoming the first African country to defeat Brazil at the World Cup. Vincent Aboubakar netted the contest's lone goal in the 2nd minute of stoppage time, and subsequently received his second booking and dismissal for removing his shirt during his celebration. It was the Seleção's first group stage loss since a 2-1 defeat to Norway in 1998 and Cameroon's first ever World Cup win since 2002. Cameroon failed to advance from their group, however, as they finished third behind Brazil and Switzerland, respectively.

Kits and crests

The Cameroon national football team's tradition color is green shirts, red shorts and yellow socks, colors of the national flag.

Cameroon national football team had long-term partnership with Puma. Since 2022 it is sponsored by One All Sports.

Controversy about sleeveless and one-piece kits
Cameroon used sleeveless Puma shirts at the 2002 African Cup of Nations in Mali, which they won for the fourth time. FIFA, however, did not allow Cameroon to use the same kits as at the 2002 World Cup, and black sleeves were added to the shirts. The 2004 African Cup of Nations witnessed Cameroon again run into controversy regarding their kits. Puma had designed a one-piece kit for the Cameroon team which FIFA declared illegal, stating that the kits must have separate shirts and shorts. FIFA then imposed fines on Cameroon and deducted six points from their qualifying campaign. Puma argued that a two-piece kit is not stated as a requirement in the FIFA laws of the game. Puma, however, lost the case in court, and Cameroon were forced to wear two-piece kits, but FIFA subsequently restored the six qualifying points to Cameroon.

Kit suppliers

Results and fixtures 

The following is a list of match results in the last 12 months, as well as any future matches that have been scheduled.

2022

2023

Coaching staff

Coaching history

Technical Committee (1960–1965)
 Dominique Colonna (1965–1970)
 Raymond Fobete (1970)
 Peter Schnittger (1970–1973)
 Vladimir Beara (1973–1975)
 Ivan Ridanović (1976–1979)
 Branko Žutić (1980–1982)
 Jean Vincent (1982)
 Radivoje Ognjanović (1982–1984)
 Claude Le Roy (1985–1988, 1998)
 Valery Nepomnyashchy (1988–1990)
 Philippe Redon (1990–1993)
 Jean Manga-Onguéné (1993–1994, 1997–1998)
 Léonard Nseké (1994)
 Henri Michel (1994)
 Jules Nyongha (1994–1996, 2007)
 Henri Depireux (1996–1997)
 Pierre Lechantre (1998–2001)
 Robert Corfou (2001)
 Jean-Paul Akono (2001, 2012–2013)
 Winfried Schäfer (2001–2004)
 Artur Jorge (2004–2006)
 Arie Haan (2006–2007)
 Otto Pfister (2007–2009)
 Thomas N'Kono (2009)
 Paul Le Guen (2009–2010)
 Javier Clemente (2010–2011)
 Denis Lavagne (2011–2012)
 Volker Finke (2013–2015)
 Alexandre Belinga (2015–2016)
 Hugo Broos (2016–2017)
 Rigobert Song (2017–2018, 2022–present)
 Clarence Seedorf (2018–2019)
 Toni Conceição (2019–2022)

Players

Current squad
The following players have been pre-selected for the 2023 Africa Cup of Nations qualification matches against Namibia on 23 and 28 March 2023.

Caps and goals correct as of 2 December 2022, after the match against Brazil.

Recent call-ups
The following players have been called up for the team in the last 12 months.

INJ = Withdrew from the squad due to injury
SUS = Serving suspension
PRE = Preliminary squad / standby
RET = Retired from international football
WD = Withdrew from the squad

Records 

Players in bold are still active with Cameroon.

Most appearances

Top goalscorers

Competitive record

FIFA World Cup 

{| class="wikitable" style="text-align: center;"
! colspan="10" |FIFA World Cup record
!width=1% rowspan=39|
!colspan=6|FIFA World Cup qualification record
|-
!Year
!Round
!Position
!
!
!*
!
!
!
!Squad
!
!
!
!
!
!
|-
| 1930
| colspan="9" rowspan="7" |Did not enter
|colspan=6 rowspan=7 |Did not enter
|-
|  1934
|-
|  1938
|-
|  1950
|-
|  1954
|-
|  1958
|-
|  1962
|-
|  1966
| colspan="9" |Withdrew
|colspan=6|Withdrew
|-
|  1970
| colspan="9" rowspan="3" |Did not qualify
| 2	
| 0
| 1
| 1	
| 3	
| 4
|-
|  1974
| 3	
| 1	
| 0	
| 2	
| 1	
| 3
|-
|  1978
| 2	
| 0	
| 1	
| 1	
| 2	
| 4
|-
|  1982
| Group stage
| 17th
| 3
| 0
| 3
| 0
| 1
| 1
|Squad
| 8	
| 5	
| 1	
| 2	
| 16	
| 5
|-
| 1986
| colspan="9" |Did not qualify
| 2	
| 0	
| 1
| 1	
| 2	
| 5
|-
|  1990
| Quarter-finals
| 7th
| 5
| 3
| 0
| 2
| 7
| 9
|Squad
| 8	
| 6	
| 1	
| 1	
| 12	
| 6
|-
|  1994
| rowspan=3|Group stage
| 22nd
| 3
| 0
| 1
| 2
| 3
| 11
|Squad
| 8	
| 5	
| 2	
| 1	
| 14	
| 4
|-
| 1998
| 25th
| 3
| 0
| 2
| 1
| 2
| 5
|Squad
| 6
| 4	
| 2	
| 0	
| 10
| 4
|-
|   2002
| 20th
| 3
| 1
| 1
| 1
| 2
| 3
|Squad
| 10
| 8	
| 1	
| 1	
| 20
| 4	
|-
|  2006
| colspan="9" |Did not qualify
| 10	
| 6	
| 3	
| 1	
| 18
| 10
|-
| 2010
| rowspan=2|Group stage
| 31st
| 3
| 0
| 0
| 3
| 2
| 5
|Squad
| 12	
| 9	
| 2	
| 1	
| 23	
| 4
|-
| 2014
| 32nd
| 3
| 0
| 0
| 3
| 1
| 9
|Squad
| 8	
| 5	
| 2	
| 1	
| 12	
| 4
|-
|  2018
| colspan="9" |Did not qualify
| 8
| 2
| 5	
| 1	
| 10
| 9
|- 
| 2022
| Group stage
| 19th
| 3
| 1
| 1
| 1
| 4
| 4
|Squad
|8
|6
|0
|2
|14
|5
|- 
|   2026
| colspan="9" |To be determined
|colspan=8 |To be determined
|-
!Total
!<small>Quarter-finals</small>
!8/22
!26
!5
!8
!13
!22
!47
!—
!95
!57
!22
!16
!157
!71
|}

 FIFA Confederations Cup 

Africa Cup of Nations
 

*Denotes draws including knockout matches decided on penalties.
**Red border color indicates tournament was held on home soil.

African Nations Championship

Summer Olympics

Football at the Summer Olympics has been an under-23 tournament since 1992.

African Games

Honours

  Africa Cup of Nations Winners (5): 1984, 1988,  2000, 2002, 2017
 Runners-up (2):  1986, 2008
 Third place (2): 1972, 2021

 FIFA Confederations Cup'''
 Runners-up (1): 2003

See also
Cameroon women's national football team
Cultural significance of the lion in Cameroon

Footnotes

References

External links

 
 RSSSF archive of results 1960–
 2010 World Cup ESPN Profile 

 
African national association football teams
C